

Events

Pre-1600
311 – The Diocletianic Persecution of Christians in the Roman Empire ends.
1315 – Enguerrand de Marigny is hanged at the instigation of Charles, Count of Valois.
1492 – Spain gives Christopher Columbus his commission of exploration. He is named admiral of the ocean sea, viceroy and governor of any territory he discovers. 
1513 – Edmund de la Pole, Yorkist pretender to the English throne, is executed on the orders of Henry VIII.
1557 – Mapuche leader Lautaro is killed by Spanish forces at the Battle of Mataquito in Chile.
1598 – Juan de Oñate begins the conquest of Santa Fe de Nuevo México.
 1598 – Henry IV of France issues the Edict of Nantes, allowing freedom of religion to the Huguenots.

1601–1900
1636 – Eighty Years' War: Dutch Republic forces recapture a strategically important fort from Spain after a nine-month siege.
1789 – On the balcony of Federal Hall on Wall Street in New York City, George Washington takes the oath of office to become the first President of the United States.
1803 – Louisiana Purchase: The United States purchases the Louisiana Territory from France for $15 million, more than doubling the size of the young nation.
1812 – The Territory of Orleans becomes the 18th U.S. state under the name Louisiana.
1838 – Nicaragua declares independence from the Central American Federation.
1863 – A 65-man French Foreign Legion infantry patrol fights a force of nearly 2,000 Mexican soldiers to nearly the last man in Hacienda Camarón, Mexico.
1871 – The Camp Grant massacre takes place in Arizona Territory.
1885 – Governor of New York David B. Hill signs legislation creating the Niagara Reservation, New York's first state park, ensuring that Niagara Falls will not be devoted solely to industrial and commercial use.
1897 – J. J. Thomson of the Cavendish Laboratory announces his discovery of the electron as a subatomic particle, over 1,800 times smaller than a proton (in the atomic nucleus), at a lecture at the Royal Institution in London.
1900 – Hawaii becomes a territory of the United States, with Sanford B. Dole as governor.

1901–present
1905 – Albert Einstein completes his doctoral thesis at the University of Zurich.
1925 – Automaker Dodge Brothers, Inc is sold to Dillon, Read & Co. for US$146 million plus $50 million for charity.
1927 – The Federal Industrial Institute for Women opens in Alderson, West Virginia, as the first women's federal prison in the United States.
1937 – The Commonwealth of the Philippines holds a plebiscite for Filipino women on whether they should be extended the right to suffrage; over 90% would vote in the affirmative.
1939 – The 1939–40 New York World's Fair opens.
 1939 – NBC inaugurates its regularly scheduled television service in New York City, broadcasting President Franklin D. Roosevelt's N.Y. World's Fair opening day ceremonial address.
1943 – World War II: The British submarine  surfaces near Huelva to cast adrift a dead man dressed as a courier and carrying false invasion plans.
1945 – World War II: Führerbunker: Adolf Hitler and Eva Braun commit suicide after being married for less than 40 hours. Soviet soldiers raise the Victory Banner over the Reichstag building.
 1945 – World War II: Stalag Luft I prisoner-of-war camp near Barth, Germany is liberated by Soviet soldiers, freeing nearly 9000 American and British airmen.
1947 – In Nevada, Boulder Dam is renamed Hoover Dam.
1948 – In Bogotá, Colombia, the Organization of American States is established.
1956 – Former Vice President and Democratic Senator Alben Barkley dies during a speech in Virginia.
1957 – Supplementary Convention on the Abolition of Slavery entered into force.
1961 – K-19, the first Soviet nuclear submarine equipped with nuclear missiles, is commissioned.
1963 – The Bristol Bus Boycott is held in Bristol to protest the Bristol Omnibus Company's refusal to employ Black or Asian bus crews, drawing national attention to racial discrimination in the United Kingdom.
1973 – Watergate scandal: U.S. President Richard Nixon announces that White House Counsel John Dean has been fired and that other top aides, most notably H. R. Haldeman and John Ehrlichman, have resigned.
1975 – Fall of Saigon: Communist forces gain control of Saigon. The Vietnam War formally ends with the unconditional surrender of South Vietnamese president Dương Văn Minh.
1980 – Beatrix is inaugurated as Queen of the Netherlands following the abdication of Juliana.
 1980 – The Iranian Embassy siege begins in London.
1982 – The Bijon Setu massacre occurs in Calcutta, India.
1993 – CERN announces World Wide Web protocols will be free.
1994 – Formula One racing driver Roland Ratzenberger is killed in a crash during the qualifying session of the San Marino Grand Prix run at Autodromo Enzo e Dino Ferrari outside Imola, Italy.
1999 – Neo-Nazi David Copeland carries out the last of his three nail bombings in London at the Admiral Duncan gay pub, killing three people and injuring 79 others.
2000 – Canonization of Faustina Kowalska in the presence of 200,000 people and the first Divine Mercy Sunday celebrated worldwide.
2004 – U.S. media release graphic photos of American soldiers committing war crimes against Iraqi prisoners at Abu Ghraib prison.
2008 – Two skeletal remains found near Yekaterinburg, Russia are confirmed by Russian scientists to be the remains of Alexei and Anastasia, two of the children of the last Tsar of Russia, whose entire family was executed at Yekaterinburg by the Bolsheviks.
2009 – Chrysler files for Chapter 11 bankruptcy.
 2009 – Seven civilians and the perpetrator are killed and another ten injured at a Queen's Day parade in Apeldoorn, Netherlands in an attempted assassination on Queen Beatrix.
2012 – An overloaded ferry capsizes on the Brahmaputra River in India killing at least 103 people.
2013 – Willem-Alexander is inaugurated as King of the Netherlands following the abdication of Beatrix.
2014 – A bomb blast in Ürümqi, China kills three people and injures 79 others.
2021 – Forty-five men and boys are killed in the Meron stampede in Israel.

Births

Pre-1600
1310 – King Casimir III of Poland (d. 1368)
1331 – Gaston III, Count of Foix (d. 1391)
1383 – Anne of Gloucester, English countess, granddaughter of King Edward III of England (d. 1438)
1425 – William III, Landgrave of Thuringia (d. 1482)
1504 – Francesco Primaticcio, Italian painter (d. 1570)
1553 – Louise of Lorraine (d. 1601)

1601–1900
1623 – François de Laval, French-Canadian bishop and saint (d. 1708)
1651 – Jean-Baptiste de La Salle, French priest and saint (d. 1719)
1662 – Mary II of England (d. 1694)
1664 – François Louis, Prince of Conti (d. 1709)
1710 – Johann Kaspar Basselet von La Rosée, Bavarian general (d. 1795)
1723 – Mathurin Jacques Brisson, French zoologist and philosopher (d. 1806)
1758 – Emmanuel Vitale, Maltese commander and politician (d. 1802)
1770 – David Thompson, English-Canadian cartographer and explorer (d. 1857)
1777 – Carl Friedrich Gauss, German mathematician and physicist (d. 1855)
1803 – Albrecht von Roon, Prussian soldier and politician, 10th Minister President of Prussia (d. 1879)
1829 – Ferdinand von Hochstetter, Austrian geologist and academic (d. 1884)
1857 – Eugen Bleuler, Swiss psychiatrist and eugenicist (d. 1940)
 1857 – Walter Simon, German banker and philanthropist (d. 1920)
1865 – Max Nettlau, German historian and academic (d. 1944)
1866 – Mary Haviland Stilwell Kuesel, American pioneer dentist (d. 1936)
1869 – Hans Poelzig, German architect, designed the IG Farben Building and Großes Schauspielhaus (d. 1936)
1870 – Franz Lehár, Hungarian composer (d. 1948)
 1870 – Dadasaheb Phalke, Indian director, producer, and screenwriter (d. 1944)
1874 – Cyriel Verschaeve, Flemish priest and author (d. 1949)
1876 – Orso Mario Corbino, Italian physicist and politician (d. 1937)
1877 – Léon Flameng, French cyclist (d. 1917)
 1877 – Alice B. Toklas, American memoirist (d. 1967)
1878 – Władysław Witwicki, Polish psychologist, philosopher, translator, historian (of philosophy and art) and artist (d. 1948)
1879 – Richárd Weisz, Hungarian Olympic champion wrestler (d. 1945) 
1880 – Charles Exeter Devereux Crombie, Scottish cartoonist (d. 1967)
1883 – Jaroslav Hašek, Czech soldier and author (d. 1923)
 1883 – Luigi Russolo, Italian painter and composer (d. 1947)
1884 – Olof Sandborg, Swedish actor (d. 1965)
1888 – John Crowe Ransom, American poet, critic, and academic (d. 1974)
1893 – Harold Breen, Australian public servant (d. 1966)
 1893 – Joachim von Ribbentrop, German soldier and politician, 14th German Reich Minister for Foreign Affairs (d. 1946)
1895 – Philippe Panneton, Canadian physician, academic, and diplomat (d. 1960)
1896 – Reverend Gary Davis, American singer and guitarist (d. 1972)
 1896 – Hans List, Austrian scientist and businessman, founded the AVL Engineering Company (d. 1996)
1897 – Humberto Mauro, Brazilian director and screenwriter (d. 1983)
1900 – Erni Krusten, Estonian author and poet (d. 1984)

1901–present
1901 – Simon Kuznets, Belarusian-American economist, statistician, and academic, Nobel Prize laureate (d. 1985)
1902 – Theodore Schultz, American economist and academic, Nobel Prize laureate (d. 1998)
1905 – Sergey Nikolsky, Russian mathematician and academic (d. 2012)
1908 – Eve Arden, American actress (d. 1990)
 1908 – Bjarni Benediktsson, Icelandic professor of law and politician, 13th Prime Minister of Iceland (d. 1970)
 1908 – Frank Robert Miller, Canadian air marshal and politician (d. 1997)
1909 – F. E. McWilliam, Irish sculptor and educator (d. 1992)
 1909 – Juliana of the Netherlands (d. 2004)
1910 – Levi Celerio, Filipino pianist, violinist, and composer (d. 2002)
1914 – Charles Beetham, American middle-distance runner (d. 1997)
 1914 – Dorival Caymmi, Brazilian singer-songwriter, actor, and painter (d. 2008)
1916 – Paul Kuusberg, Estonian journalist and author (d. 2003)
 1916 – Claude Shannon, American mathematician and engineer (d. 2001)
 1916 – Robert Shaw, American conductor (d. 1999)
1917 – Bea Wain, American singer (d. 2017)
1920 – Duncan Hamilton, Irish-English race car driver and pilot (d. 1994)
 1920 – Gerda Lerner, Austrian-American historian and woman's history author (d. 2013)
 1920 – Tom Moore, British army officer and fundraiser (d. 2021)
1921 – Roger L. Easton, American scientist, co-invented the GPS (d. 2014)
1922 – Anton Murray, South African cricketer (d. 1995)
1923 – Percy Heath, American bassist (d. 2005)
 1923 – Kagamisato Kiyoji, Japanese sumo wrestler, the 42nd Yokozuna (d. 2004)
1924 – Uno Laht, Estonian KGB officer and author (d. 2008)
1925 – Corinne Calvet, French actress (d. 2001)
 1925 – Johnny Horton, American singer-songwriter and guitarist (d. 1960)
1926 – Shrinivas Khale, Indian composer (d. 2011)
 1926 – Cloris Leachman, American actress and comedian (d. 2021)
1928 – Hugh Hood, Canadian author and academic (d. 2000)
 1928 – Orlando Sirola, Italian tennis player (d. 1995)
1930 – Félix Guattari, French psychotherapist and philosopher (d. 1992)
1933 – Charles Sanderson, Baron Sanderson of Bowden, English politician
1934 – Jerry Lordan, English singer-songwriter (d. 1995)
 1934 – Don McKenney, Canadian ice hockey player and coach (d. 2022)
1937 – Tony Harrison, English poet and playwright
1938 – Gary Collins, American actor and talk show host (d. 2012)
 1938 – Juraj Jakubisko, Slovak director and screenwriter (d. 2023)
 1938 – Larry Niven, American author and screenwriter
1940 – Jeroen Brouwers, Dutch journalist and writer
 1940 – Michael Cleary, Australian rugby player and politician
 1940 – Ülo Õun, Estonian sculptor (d. 1988)
1941 – Stavros Dimas, Greek lawyer and politician, Greek Minister of Foreign Affairs
 1941 – Max Merritt, New Zealand-Australian singer-songwriter (d. 2020)
1942 – Sallehuddin of Kedah, Sultan of Kedah
1943 – Frederick Chiluba, Zambian politician, 2nd President of Zambia (d. 2011)
 1943 – Bobby Vee, American pop singer-songwriter (d. 2016)
1944 – Jon Bing, Norwegian author, scholar, and academic (d. 2014)
 1944 – Jill Clayburgh, American actress (d. 2010)
1945 – J. Michael Brady, British radiologist
 1945 – Annie Dillard, American novelist, essayist, and poet
 1945 – Mimi Fariña, American singer-songwriter, guitarist, and activist (d. 2001)
 1945 – Michael J. Smith, American pilot, and astronaut (d. 1986)
1946 – King Carl XVI Gustaf of Sweden
 1946 – Bill Plympton, American animator, producer, and screenwriter
 1946 – Don Schollander, American swimmer
1947 – Paul Fiddes, English theologian and academic
 1947 – Finn Kalvik, Norwegian singer-songwriter and guitarist
 1947 – Tom Køhlert, Danish footballer and manager
 1947 – Mats Odell, Swedish economist and politician, Swedish Minister for Financial Markets
1948 – Wayne Kramer, American guitarist and singer-songwriter
 1948 – Pierre Pagé, Canadian ice hockey player and coach
 1948 – Margit Papp, Hungarian athlete
1949 – Phil Garner, American baseball player and manager
 1949 – António Guterres, Portuguese academic and politician, 114th Prime Minister of Portugal and 9th Secretary-General of the United Nations
 1949 – Karl Meiler, German tennis player (d. 2014)
1952 – Jacques Audiard, French director and screenwriter
 1952 – Jack Middelburg, Dutch motorcycle racer (d. 1984)
1953 – Merrill Osmond, American singer and bass player
1954 – Jane Campion, New Zealand director, producer, and screenwriter
 1954 – Kim Darroch, English diplomat, UK Permanent Representative to the European Union
 1954 – Frank-Michael Marczewski, German footballer
1955 – Nicolas Hulot, French journalist and environmentalist
 1955 – David Kitchin, English lawyer and judge
 1955 – Zlatko Topčić, Bosnian writer and screenwriter
1956 – Lars von Trier, Danish director and screenwriter
1957 – Wonder Mike, American rapper and songwriter 
1958 – Charles Berling, French actor, director, and screenwriter
1959 – Stephen Harper, Canadian economist and politician, 22nd Prime Minister of Canada
1960 – Geoffrey Cox, English lawyer and politician
 1960 – Kerry Healey, American academic and politician, 70th Lieutenant Governor of Massachusetts
1961 – Arnór Guðjohnsen, Icelandic footballer 
 1961 – Isiah Thomas, American basketball player, coach, and sportscaster
1963 – Andrew Carwood, English tenor and conductor
 1963 – Michael Waltrip, American race car driver and sportscaster
1964 – Tony Fernandes, Malaysian-Indian businessman, co-founded Tune Group
 1964 – Ian Healy, Australian cricketer, coach, and sportscaster
 1964 – Lorenzo Staelens, Belgian footballer and manager
 1964 – Abhishek Chatterjee, Indian actor
1965 – Daniela Costian, Romanian-Australian discus thrower
 1965 – Adrian Pasdar, American actor
1966 – Jeff Brown, Canadian ice hockey player and coach
 1966 – Dave Meggett, American football player and coach
1967 – Phil Chang, Taiwanese singer-songwriter and actor
 1967 – Philipp Kirkorov, Bulgarian-born Russian singer, composer and actor
1969 – Warren Defever, American bass player and producer 
 1969 – Justine Greening, English accountant and politician, Secretary of State for International Development
 1969 – Paulo Jr., Brazilian bass player
1972 – Takako Tokiwa, Japanese actress
1973 – Leigh Francis, English comedian and actor
1974 – Christian Tamminga, Dutch athlete 
1975 – Johnny Galecki, American actor
1976 – Davian Clarke, Jamaican sprinter
 1976 – Amanda Palmer, American singer-songwriter and pianist 
 1976 – Daniel Wagon, Australian rugby league player
 1976 – Victor J. Glover, American astronaut
1977 – Jeannie Haddaway, American politician
 1977 – Meredith L. Patterson, American technologist, journalist, and author
1978 – Liljay, Taiwanese singer
1979 – Gerardo Torrado, Mexican footballer
1980 – Luis Scola, Argentinian basketball player
 1980 – Jeroen Verhoeven, Dutch footballer
1981 – Nicole Kaczmarski, American basketball player
 1981 – John O'Shea, Irish footballer
 1981 – Kunal Nayyar, British-Indian actor
 1981 – Justin Vernon, American singer-songwriter, multi-instrumentalist, and producer 
1982 – Kirsten Dunst, American actress
 1982 – Drew Seeley, Canadian-American singer-songwriter, dancer, and actor
1983 – Chris Carr, American football player
 1983 – Tatjana Hüfner, German luger
 1983 – Marina Tomić, Slovenian hurdler
 1983 – Troy Williamson, American football player
1984 – Seimone Augustus, American basketball player
 1984 – Shawn Daivari, American wrestler and manager
 1984 – Risto Mätas, Estonian javelin thrower
 1984 – Lee Roache, English footballer
1985 – Brandon Bass, American basketball player
 1985 – Gal Gadot, Israeli actress and model
 1985 – Ashley Alexandra Dupré, American journalist, singer, and prostitute
1986 – Dianna Agron, American actress and singer
 1986 – Martten Kaldvee, Estonian biathlete
1987 – Alipate Carlile, Australian footballer
 1987 – Chris Morris, South African cricketer
 1987 – Rohit Sharma, Indian cricketer
1988 – Andy Allen, Australian chef
 1988 – Sander Baart, Dutch field hockey player 
 1988 – Ana de Armas, Cuban actress
 1988 – Liu Xijun, Chinese singer
 1988 – Oh Hye-ri, South Korean taekwondo athlete
1989 – Jang Wooyoung, South Korean singer and actor
1990 – Jonny Brownlee, English triathlete
 1990 – Mac DeMarco, Canadian singer-songwriter
 1990 – Kaarel Kiidron, Estonian footballer
 1990 – Paula Ribó, Spanish singer-songwriter and actress
1991 – Chris Kreider, American ice hockey player
1991 – Travis Scott, American rapper and producer
 1992 – Marc-André ter Stegen, German footballer
1993 – Dion Dreesens, Dutch swimmer
 1993 – Martin Fuksa, Czech canoeist
1994 – Chae Seo-jin, South Korean actress
 1994 – Wang Yafan, Chinese tennis player
1996 – Luke Friend, English singer
1997 – Adam Ryczkowski, Polish footballer
1998 – Georgina Amorós, Spanish actress
1999 – Jorden van Foreest, Dutch chess grandmaster
 1999 – Krit Amnuaydechkorn, Thai actor and singer
2000 – Yui Hiwatashi, Japanese singer
2002 – Anna Cramling, Spanish-Swedish chess player
 2002 – Teden Mengi, English footballer
2003 – Emily Carey, British actress
 2003 – Jung Yun-seok, South Korean actor

Deaths

Pre-1600
AD 65 – Lucan, Roman poet (b. 39)
125 – An, Chinese emperor (b. 94)
 535 – Amalasuntha, Ostrogothic queen and regent
 783 – Hildegard of the Vinzgau, Frankish queen
1002 – Eckard I, German nobleman
1030 – Mahmud of Ghazni, Ghaznavid emir (b. 971)
1063 – Ren Zong, Chinese emperor (b. 1010)
1131 – Adjutor, French knight and saint
1305 – Roger de Flor, Italian military adventurer (b. 1267)
1341 – John III, duke of Brittany (b. 1286)
1439 – Richard de Beauchamp, 13th Earl of Warwick, English commander (b. 1382)
1524 – Pierre Terrail, seigneur de Bayard, French soldier (b. 1473)
1544 – Thomas Audley, 1st Baron Audley of Walden, English lawyer and judge, Lord Chancellor of England (b. 1488)
1550 – Tabinshwehti, Burmese king (b. 1516)

1601–1900
1632 – Johann Tserclaes, Count of Tilly, Bavarian general (b. 1559)
 1632 – Sigismund III Vasa, Swedish-Polish son of John III of Sweden (b. 1566)
1637 – Niwa Nagashige, Japanese daimyō (b. 1571)
1655 – Eustache Le Sueur, French painter (b. 1617)
1660 – Petrus Scriverius, Dutch historian and scholar (b. 1576)
1672 – Marie of the Incarnation, French-Canadian nun and saint, founded the Ursulines of Quebec (b. 1599)
1696 – Robert Plot, English chemist and academic (b. 1640)
1712 – Philipp van Limborch, Dutch theologian and author (b. 1633)
1733 – Rodrigo Anes de Sá Almeida e Meneses, 1st Marquis of Abrantes, Portuguese diplomat (b. 1676)
1736 – Johann Albert Fabricius, German scholar and author (b. 1668)
1758 – François d'Agincourt, French organist and composer (b. 1684)
1792 – John Montagu, 4th Earl of Sandwich, English politician, Secretary of State for the Northern Department (b. 1718)
1795 – Jean-Jacques Barthélemy, French archaeologist and author (b. 1716)
1806 – Onogawa Kisaburō, Japanese sumo wrestler, the 5th Yokozuna (b. 1758)
1841 – Peter Andreas Heiberg, Danish philologist and author (b. 1758)
1847 – Charles, Austrian commander and duke of Teschen (b. 1771)
1863 – Jean Danjou, French captain (b. 1828)
1865 – Robert FitzRoy, English admiral, meteorologist, and politician, 2nd Governor of New Zealand (b. 1805)
1870 – Thomas Cooke, Canadian bishop and missionary (b. 1792)
1875 – Jean-Frédéric Waldeck, French explorer, lithographer, and cartographer (b. 1766)
1879 – Emma Smith, American religious leader (b. 1804)
1883 – Édouard Manet, French painter (b. 1832)
1891 – Joseph Leidy, American paleontologist and author (b. 1823)
1900 – Casey Jones, American railroad engineer (b. 1864)

1901–present
1903 – Emily Stowe, Canadian physician and activist (b. 1831)
1910 – Jean Moréas, Greek poet and critic (b. 1856)
1926 – Bessie Coleman, American pilot (b. 1892)
1936 – A. E. Housman, English poet and scholar (b. 1859)
1939 – Frank Haller, American boxer (b. 1883)
1943 – Eddy Hamel, American footballer (b. 1902)
 1943 – Otto Jespersen, Danish linguist and academic (b. 1860)
 1943 – Beatrice Webb, English sociologist and economist (b. 1858) 

1945 – Eva Braun, German photographer and office and lab assistant,  wife of Adolf Hitler (b. 1912)
  1945   – Adolf Hitler, Austrian-German politician and author, dictator of Nazi Germany (b. 1889)
1953 – Jacob Linzbach, Estonian linguist and author (b. 1874)
1956 – Alben W. Barkley, American lawyer and politician, 35th Vice President of the United States (b. 1877)
1970 – Jacques Presser, Dutch historian, writer and poet (b. 1899)
 1970 – Inger Stevens, Swedish-American actress (b. 1934)
1972 – Gia Scala, English-American model and actress (b. 1934)
1973 – Václav Renč, Czech poet and playwright (b. 1911)
1974 – Agnes Moorehead, American actress (b. 1900)
1980 – Luis Muñoz Marín, Puerto Rican journalist and politician, 1st Governor of Puerto Rico (b. 1898)
1982 – Lester Bangs, American journalist and author (b. 1949)
1983 – George Balanchine, Russian dancer and choreographer (b. 1904)
 1983 – Muddy Waters, American singer-songwriter, guitarist, and bandleader (b. 1913)
 1983 – Edouard Wyss-Dunant, Swiss physician and mountaineer (b. 1897)
1986 – Robert Stevenson, English director, producer, and screenwriter (b. 1905)
1989 – Sergio Leone, Italian director, producer, and screenwriter (b. 1929)
1993 – Tommy Caton, English footballer (b. 1962)
1994 – Roland Ratzenberger, Austrian race car driver (b. 1960)
 1994 – Richard Scarry, American author and illustrator (b. 1919)
1995 – Maung Maung Kha, Burmese colonel and politician, 8th Prime Minister of Burma (b. 1920)
1998 – Nizar Qabbani, Syrian-English poet, publisher, and diplomat (b. 1926)
2000 – Poul Hartling, Danish politician, 36th Prime Minister of Denmark (b. 1914)
2002 – Charlotte von Mahlsdorf, German philanthropist, founded the Gründerzeit Museum (b. 1928)
2003 – Mark Berger, American economist and academic (b. 1955)
 2003 – Possum Bourne, New Zealand race car driver (b. 1956)
2005 – Phil Rasmussen, American lieutenant and pilot (b. 1918)
2006 – Jean-François Revel, French philosopher (b. 1924)
 2006 – Pramoedya Ananta Toer, Indonesian author and academic (b. 1925)
2007 – Kevin Mitchell, American football player (b. 1971)
 2007 – Tom Poston, American actor, comedian, and game show panelist (b. 1921)
 2007 – Gordon Scott, American film and television actor (b. 1926)
2008 – Juancho Evertsz, Dutch Antillean politician (b. 1923)
2009 – Henk Nijdam, Dutch cyclist (b. 1935)
2011 – Dorjee Khandu, Indian politician, 6th Chief Minister of Arunachal Pradesh (b. 1955)
 2011 – Evald Okas, Estonian painter (b. 1915)
 2011 – Ernesto Sabato, Argentinian physicist, author, and painter (b. 1911)
2012 – Tomás Borge, Nicaraguan poet and politician, co-founded the Sandinista National Liberation Front (b. 1930)
 2012 – Alexander Dale Oen, Norwegian swimmer (b. 1985) 
 2012 – Giannis Gravanis, Greek footballer (b. 1958)
 2012 – Benzion Netanyahu, Russian-Israeli historian and academic (b. 1910)
2013 – Roberto Chabet, Filipino painter and sculptor (b. 1937)
 2013 – Shirley Firth, Canadian skier (b. 1953)
 2013 – Viviane Forrester, French author and critic (b. 1925)
2014 – Khaled Choudhury, Indian painter and set designer (b. 1919)
 2014 – Julian Lewis, English biologist and academic (b. 1946)
 2014 – Carl E. Moses, American businessman and politician (b. 1929)
 2014 – Ian Ross, Australian journalist (b. 1940)
2015 – Ben E. King, American singer-songwriter and producer (b. 1938)
2016 – Daniel Berrigan, American priest and activist (b. 1921)
 2016 – Harry Kroto, English chemist and academic, Nobel Prize laureate (b. 1939)
2019 – Peter Mayhew, English-American actor (b. 1944)
2020 – Tony Allen, Nigerian drummer and composer (b. 1940)
  2020   – Rishi Kapoor, Indian actor, film director and producer (b. 1952)
2021 – Anthony Payne, English composer (b. 1936)
2022 – Naomi Judd, American singer-songwriter and actress (b. 1946)
  2022   – Mino Raiola, Italian football agent (b. 1967)

Holidays and observances
Armed Forces Day (Georgia)
Camarón Day (French Foreign Legion)
Children's Day (Mexico)
Christian feast day:
Adjutor
Aimo
Amator, Peter and Louis
Donatus of Evorea
Eutropius of Saintes
Marie Guyart (Anglican Church of Canada)
Marie of the Incarnation (Ursuline)
Maximus of Rome
Blessed Miles Gerard
Pomponius of Naples
Pope Pius V
Quirinus of Neuss
Sarah Josepha Hale (Episcopal Church)
Suitbert the Younger 
April 30 (Eastern Orthodox liturgics)
Consumer Protection Day (Thailand)
Honesty Day (United States)
International Jazz Day (UNESCO)
Martyrs' Day (Pakistan)
May Eve, the eve of the first day of summer in the Northern hemisphere (see May 1):
Beltane begins at sunset in the Northern hemisphere, Samhain begins at sunset in the Southern hemisphere. (Neo-Druidic Wheel of the Year)
Carodejnice (Czech Republic and Slovakia)
Walpurgis Night (Central and Northern Europe)
National Persian Gulf Day (Iran)
Reunification Day (Vietnam)
Rincon Day (Bonaire)
Russian State Fire Service Day (Russia)
Teachers' Day (Paraguay)

References

External links

 BBC: On This Day
 
 Historical Events on April 30

Days of the year
April